Eunice Frost (1914–1998), was a British publisher. She started in 1936, working for Penguin Books, as secretary to co-founder Allen Lane, but soon was promoted to editor, and eventually a director of the company.

References

1914 births
1998 deaths
British book publishers (people)